Qazvin Airport  is an airport in Qazvin, Iran.

References

External links 
 Airport information for GZW

Airports in Iran
Buildings and structures in Qazvin Province
Transportation in Qazvin Province